Mount Helios is a peak  northeast of Mount Theseus, rising to  in the eastern part of the Olympus Range, Victoria Land, Antarctica. In association with the names grouped in this area from Greek mythology, it was named by the Advisory Committee on Antarctic Names in 1997 after Helios, the sun god.

References

Mountains of Victoria Land
McMurdo Dry Valleys